This is a list of diplomatic missions of Ukraine.

During elections, most of Ukraine's diplomatic missions have voting rooms, the polling stations of which belong to the Overseas Electoral District .

History

Ukraine opened 18 diplomatic missions in 1992: 

 Embassies in Austria, Belgium, Belarus, Canada, Czech Republic,  Finland, Germany, Greece, Georgia, Hungary, Italy, Israel, Iran, United Kingdom, United States, Poland, Russia, Romania. 
 General Consulates in New York City , Chicago and Munich. 

In 1993, 15 diplomatic missions were opened : 

 Embassies in Argentina, Bulgaria, China, Estonia, Egypt, France, Guinea, India, Lithuania, Moldova, Switzerland, Slovakia, Uzbekistan, United Arab Emirates and the Consulate General in Toronto  

In 1994, embassies of Ukraine were opened in Kazakhstan, Cuba, Turkey and consulates general in Gdansk and Istanbul .

Current missions

Africa

Americas

Asia

Europe

Oceania

Multilateral organizations

Gallery

Non-resident embassies (still unverified) 

  (Havana)
  (Brasilia)
  (Brasilia)
  (Brasilia)
  (Canberra)
  (Tokyo)
  (Tokyo)
  (Canberra)
  (Canberra)
  (Tokyo)
  (Canberra)
  (Havana)
  (Brasilia)
  (Brasilia)
  (Canberra)
  (Canberra)
  (Canberra)

Closed missions

Africa

Americas

Asia

Europe

See also 
 Foreign relations of Ukraine
 List of diplomatic missions in Ukraine
 Visa policy of Ukraine

Notes

References

External links
 Ministry of Foreign Affairs of Ukraine
 Details of diplomatic missions of Ukraine
 Map of embassies of Ukraine

 
Ukraine
Diplomatic missions